Greenville High School is the name of several high schools in the United States:
Greenville High School (Greenville, Georgia)
Greenville Middle/High School, Greenville, Maine
Greenville High School (Greenville, Illinois)
Greenville High School (Greenville, Michigan)
Greenville High School (New York), Greenville, New York
Greenville High School (Ohio), Greenville, Ohio
Greenville Junior/Senior High School, in Greenville Area School District, Pennsylvania
Greenville High School (Greenville, South Carolina)
Greenville High School, Greenville, Texas
Greenville Technical Charter High School, Greenville, South Carolina
Greenville Weston High School, Greenville, Mississippi